Giovanni Vemba-Duarte (born January 21, 1991 in Cabinda) is a Dutch-Angolan footballer.

Career

Club
He is a trainee of Twente Enschede. In the summer 2010, he joined Polish club Arka Gdynia on a two-year contract deal. He was released from Arka one year later.

References

External links
 

1991 births
Living people
Arka Gdynia players
Angolan footballers
Dutch footballers
Dutch people of Angolan descent
Association football forwards
Ekstraklasa players
Expatriate footballers in Poland
Dutch expatriate sportspeople in Poland
People from Cabinda (city)
Angolan expatriate sportspeople in Poland
Dutch expatriate footballers
Angolan expatriate footballers
Sportspeople from Cabinda Province
FC Twente players
Footballers from Overijssel
Refugees in Europe
Vv Hoogeveen players